Love, Weddings & Other Disasters is a 2020 romantic comedy film written and directed by Dennis Dugan, from a story by Dugan, Eileen Conn and Larry Miller. It stars Diane Keaton, Jeremy Irons, Maggie Grace, Diego Boneta and Andrew Bachelor.

It was released on December 4, 2020, by Saban Films.

Plot
Jessie a florist gets dumped mid parachute jump, she ends up dropping her ex-boyfriend in to a lake next to a wedding which she ends up crashing in to unable to control her parachute, Jessie goes viral and is dubbed "the wedding trasher". Jessie is later unexpectedly hired to be a wedding planner by the modern fiancé Liz of Robert a man who is running for mayor and create a fun party atmosphere for the reception. 

The Bride Liz and groom Robert have conflicting ideas on the wedding the brides wants a modern wedding with a band and a party the groom was a traditional wedding with a string quartet. The groom ends up hiring equally perfectionist and demanding wedding planner Lawrence Phillips who Jessie crashed into with her electric scooter. The two wedding planners start to butt heads with their different views.

Lawerence Phillips a perfectionist OCD planner who gets set up on an impromptu blind date with a women who is actually blind. Lawerence is a widower who hasn’t been on a date in 5 years and has become grumpy and bitter unable to laugh. Sarah the blind women opens Lawrence to new things although he keeps messing up he tries very hard even putting a blindfold on to experience life as she does. Lawrence starts to become happy and even nice. 

Robert the Mayoral candidate and groom’s brother Jimmy is the polar opposite of his brother. Jimmy is a gambler and in a large amount of debt with some dangerous people. Jimmy goes on a tv show called Crash couples to win money and ends up being chained together with a stripper called Olga for 24 hours while being filmed who is also trying to win money to get away from her life.
Robert supports his brother on the tv show and still wants him in the wedding although he doesn’t understand why he didn’t tel him about the debt. 
Jimmy and Olga ending up winning the crash couple competition with some help from Olga’s Marfia connections who have become their business partners. 

Robert’s chief of staff doesn’t agree with the wedding and wants a more traditional something that can go on the press for Robert to go up in points in the press even following Ritchie to meet his Cinderella on tv unfortunately she doesn’t show as he helped Robert get out of traffic and to his wedding his invited to the wedding where he bumps in to his Cinderella. 

High school friends Mack and Lenny are in a band together and start have tension with each other when Lenny gets a girlfriend Yoni.
Jessie tries to hire them and arm wrestles Mack to get them to play at Liz and Robert Wedding. 
Mack and Lenny end up agreeing to do the wedding. However things go down hill when Lenny invites his girlfriend Yoni to play with the band and they secretly make a demo without telling Mack. The band breaks up so Jessie asks the buskers in the park across the street to help.
Mack asks Jessie out she says no at first but they start to develop feelings for each other. 

A local tour guide Captain Ritchie ends up on tv for his funny and original tours. Ritchie searches for his "Cinderella" a women who had a tattoo of a glass slipper on her neck. Ritchie  never saw again after meeting her on a tour.

Throughout the whole movie two buskers start gradually playing together.

Cast

 Diane Keaton as Sara
 Jeremy Irons as Lawrence Phillips
 Diego Boneta as Mack
 JinJoo Lee as Yoni
 Jesse McCartney as Lenny
 Veronica Ferres as Bev
 Dennis Staroselsky as Robert Barton
 Todd Stashwick as Zhopa
 Maggie Grace as Jessie
 Caroline Portu as Liz Rafferty
 Melinda Hill as Svetlana
 Andrew Bachelor as Captain Ritchie
 William Xifaras as Menny
 Gail Bennington as Tina
 Elle King as Jordan
 Keaton Simons as Guitar Player
 Dennis Dugan as Eddie Stone

Production
In August 2019, it was announced Diane Keaton, Jeremy Irons, Diego Boneta, JinJoo Lee, Jesse McCartney and Veronica Ferres had joined the cast of the film, with Dennis Dugan directing from a screenplay he wrote, alongside Eileen Conn and Larry Miller. In September 2019,  Todd Stashwick, Dennis Staroselsky, Maggie Grace, Caroline Portu and Melinda Hill joined the cast of the film. In October 2019, Andrew Bachelor joined the cast of the film. Also joining were Elle King and Keaton Simons.

Principal photography began in September 2019. Filming took place in Boston, including in the Public Garden and various locations in South Boston.

Release
In August 2020, Saban Films acquired distribution rights to the film and set its release in US theaters for December 4, 2020. The same day it was released on VOD by Lionsgate Home Entertainment.

Reception

Box office
Love, Weddings & Other Disasters grossed $0 in the United States and Canada, and a worldwide total of $922,586.

Critical response
The website's critics consensus reads: "A romantic comedy only in the loosest sense, Love, Weddings & Other Disasters offers a sobering reminder that even stars like Diane Keaton and Jeremy Irons occasionally do unpleasant things to pay the bills." On Metacritic, the film holds a rating of 11 out of 100, based on seven critics, indicating "overwhelming dislike".

References

External links
 
 

2020 films
2020 romantic comedy films
American romantic comedy films
Films about weddings
Films directed by Dennis Dugan
Films shot in Boston
Saban Films films
2020s English-language films
2020s American films